Minusheet perfusion culture system is used for advanced cell culture experiments in combination with adherent cells and to generate specialized tissues in combination with selected biomaterials, special tissue carriers and compatible perfusion culture containers.

The technical development of the Minusheet perfusion culture system was driven by the idea to create under in vitro conditions an environment resembling as near as possible the situation of specialized tissues found within the organism. Basis of this invention is therefore individually selected biomaterials for optimal cell adhesion mounted in Minusheet tissue carriers. Moreover, to always offer fresh nutrition including respiratory gas and to simulate a tissue-specific fluid environment, the tissue carriers can be inserted into compatible perfusion culture containers. As a result, a variety of publications illustrates that tissues generated by this innovative approach exhibit an excellent and stable quality. Thus, on the one hand the system provides a highly adaptable basis for the culture of adherent cells and the generation of specialized tissues. On the other hand the Minusheet perfusion culture system is bridging a methodical gap between the conventional static 24 well culture plate and modern perfusion culture technology.

Crucial generation of specialized tissues
Specialized tissues in culture are urgently needed in regenerative medicine, tissue engineering, nanotechnology, biomaterial research and advanced toxicity testing of newly developed pharmaceuticals. However, it is often observed that raised tissues do not exhibit expected functional features. Instead dedifferentiation is observed [1-4]. These cell biological alterations arise after isolation of cells and proceed during static culture in a dish due to suboptimal fluid environment and minor adhesion on biomaterials. Further uncontrolled supply with nutrition and respiratory gas, an overshoot of metabolites and paracrine factors or missing rheological stress can increase the degree of dedifferentiation. In consequence, regarding an optimal generation of specialized tissues a powerful strategy has to exclude as much as possible harmful parameters, while factors supporting the process of tissue development must be intensified [5].

Selected biomaterials promote development within a tissue carrier
Under natural conditions a prerequisite for an optimal tissue development is a cell-specific interaction with the extracellular matrix, while under in vitro conditions a substitute for the extracellular matrix has to be selected. However, the crucial problem is that a biomaterial can influence the development of functional features within a maturing tissue in a good and in a bad sense. In consequence, the suitability of a decellularized extracellular matrix, newly developed synthetic polymers, biodegradable scaffolds, ceramics or metal alloys cannot be predicted but must be tested. 
To meet parameters positively influencing cell adhesion and communication, the technical concept is based on a Minusheet tissue carrier (Fig. 1). By the help of this tool cell adhesion and development of tissue can be tested with individually selected biomaterials. These experiments can be performed first under static (Fig. 2) and then under dynamic (Fig. 3) culture conditions [6]. In both cases a Minusheet tissue carrier prevents damage but supports development of contained cells or tissues during experimentation.  

To stay compatible with a conventional 24 well culture plate a selected biomaterial must be punched in a diameter of 13 mm. In this format many materials are also commercially available. Further materials can be applied in form of filters, foils, nets, fleeces and scaffolds (Fig. 1a). For an easy handling and to prevent damage during development the selected specimens are placed in the base part of a Minusheet tissue carrier (Fig. 1b). Pressing down a tension ring the biomaterial is held in position (Fig. 1c). After mounting a tissue carrier is enveloped in a bag and sterilized.

Cell seeding on a tissue carrier
For cell seeding the mounted tissue carrier is transferred by a forceps in a 24 well culture plate (Fig. 2). To concentrate cells on top of a tissue carrier culture medium is added to a level so that the selected biomaterial is just wetted. Then an aliquot of cells is transferred by a pipette to the surface of the mounted biomaterial.
 

A standard culture protocol with a tissue carrier can be initiated by seeding cells onto the upper side. When a tissue carrier is turned, cells can also be seeded on the other side so that co-culture experiments with two different cell types become possible.
Not only single cells but also a thin slice of tissue can be mounted between two pieces of a woven net within a Minusheet tissue carrier. Further flexible materials such as collagen sheets can be used in a tissue carrier like the skin of a drum. Last but not least excellent results were obtained by mounting a polyester fleece as an artificial interstitium for spatial parenchyma development [5,6,8]. It is obvious that for each specialized tissue very individual spatial environments within a tissue carrier can be created.

Compatible perfusion culture containers
It has been shown that the static environment within a 24 well culture plate leads to a decrease of nutrition and hormones, an uncontrollable increase of metabolites and an overshoot of paracrine factors during time. Due to these reasons a Minusheet tissue carrier with adherent cells is used only for the short period of cell seeding in a 24 well culture plate.
In consequence, after adhesion of cells the tissue carrier is transferred to a perfusion culture container to offer a dynamic fluid environment. To meet the individual requirements of specialized tissues a variety of perfusion culture containers was constructed (Fig. 3).
 

 
Each of the perfusion culture containers has at least one inlet and one outlet for the transport of culture medium. A basic version of a container allows the simple bathing of cells respectively growing tissues under continuous medium transport (Fig. 4a). In a gradient container the tissue carrier is placed between the base and the lid so that both sides can be provided with individual media mimicking a typical environment for epithelia (Fig. 4b). A further culture container is made of a transparent lid and base allowing the microscopic observation during tissue development (Fig. 4c).
 

In addition, a perfusion culture container can exhibit a flexible silicone lid. Applying force to this lid by an eccentric rotor simulates a mechanical load as required in cartilage and bone tissue engineering. Shaped tissues such as an auricle or different forms of cartilage can be generated with individual scaffolds in a special tissue engineering container. Finally, spatial extension of tubules derived from renal stem/progenitor cells is obtained within a perfusion container filled with an artificial interstitium made of polyester fleece. Finally, all of these containers are machined out of a special polycarbonate (Makrolon®) so that all of them can be autoclaved for multiple uses.

Performance of perfusion culture experiments
To maintain the necessary temperature of 37 °C within a perfusion culture container, a heating plate (MEDAX-Nagel, Kiel, Germany) and a cover lid (not shown) are used during performance of culture experiments over weeks (Fig. 5, 7). The transport of culture medium is best accomplished using a slowly rotating peristaltic pump (ISMATEC, IPC N8, Wertheim, Germany). It is able to deliver adjustable and exact pump rates between 0.1 and 5 mL per hour.
 

On the passage from the storage bottle through the perfusion culture container medium is transported along a mounted tissue carrier to provide contained cells. The exact geometrical placement of the tissue carrier within a perfusion culture container guarantees during transport of medium provision with always fresh nutrition and respiratory gas from all sides. At the same time it prevents an unphysiological accumulation of metabolic products and an overshoot of paracrine factors. To maintain for the whole culture period this controlled environment, the metabolized medium is collected in a separate waste bottle. In consequence, medium is not recirculated.

Stabilization of pH during perfusion culture
Normally cell culture experiments are performed in a CO2 incubator. Also perfusion culture experiments can be performed in such an atmosphere. However, a much better solution is the performance of perfusion culture experiments under atmospheric air on a laboratory table, since it facilitates the complete handling. However, in this case the culture medium has to be adjusted to atmospheric air.
Keeping media in a 5% CO2 atmosphere within an incubator always a relatively high amount of NaHCO3 is contained to maintain a constant pH between 7.2 and 7.4. If such a formulated medium is used for perfusion culture outside a CO2 incubator, the pH will shift from the physiological range to much more alkaline values due to the low content of CO2 (0.3%) in atmospheric air.
For that reason any medium used for perfusion culture outside a CO2 incubator has to be stabilized by reducing the NaHCO3 concentration and/or by adding biological buffers such as HEPES (GIBCO/Invitrogen, Karlsruhe, Germany) or BUFFER ALL (Sigma-Aldrich-Chemie, München, Germany). The necessary amount can be easily determined by admixing increasing amounts of biological buffer solution to an aliquot of medium. Then the medium must equilibrate over night on a thermo plate at 37 °C under atmospheric air. For example, application of 50 mmol/L HEPES or an equivalent of BUFFER ALL (ca. 1%) to IMDM (Iscove’s Modified Dulbecco’s Medium, GIBCO/Invitrogen) will maintain a constant pH of 7.4 throughout long term perfusion culture under atmospheric air on a laboratory table.

Availability of oxygen in medium
To obtain in a perfusion culture experiment a high saturation of O2 a selected medium such as IMDM has to be transported through a gas permeable silicone tube. The use of a silicone tube provides a large surface for gas exchange by diffusion due to a thin wall (1 mm), the small inner diameter (1 mm) and its extended length (1 m). For example, analysis of IMDM (3024 mg/L NaHCO3, 50 mmol/L HEPES) equilibrated against atmospheric air during a standard perfusion culture experiment shows constant partial pressures of at least 160 mmHg O2 [7].

Modulation of oxygen content
It has been shown that growing cells and tissues have very individual oxygen requirements. Due to this reason it is important that the content of oxygen can be adapted in individual perfusion culture experiments. The technical solution is a gas exchanger module containing a gas inlet and outlet (Fig. 6a). Further a spiral with a long thin-walled silicon tube for medium transport is mounted inside the module. Since the tube is highly gas-permeable, it guarantees optimal diffusion of gases between culture medium and internal atmosphere of the gas exchange module. In consequence, the desired gas atmosphere can be adjusted by a constant flow of a specific gas mixture through the module. This way the content of oxygen or any other gases can be modulated in the medium by diffusion. Applying this simple protocol it became possible to decrease the oxygen partial pressure within the transported medium during long term culture experiments under absolutely sterile conditions [7].

Elimination of harmful gas bubbles
Performing perfusion culture experiments it always has to be considered that gas bubbles are forming during slow transport of culture medium. They arise during suction of medium in the storage bottle, during transport within the tube, during distribution within the culture container and during elimination on the way to the waste bottle. Due to unknown reasons gas bubbles accumulate especially at material transitions between tubes, connectors and perfusion containers. First these gas bubbles are so small that they cannot be observed with the human eye, but during ongoing transport of culture medium they increase in size and are able to form an embolus that massively impedes medium flow. Within a culture container gas bubbles are leading to a regional shortage of medium supply and are causing breaks in the fluid continuum so that massive fluid pressure changes result. In a gradient perfusion culture container, where two media are transported at exactly the same speed, embolic effects can lead to pressure differences destroying in turn the contained epithelial barrier [5,9].

To avoid the concentration of gas bubbles within a perfusion culture experiment, a gas expander module was developed (Fig. 6b). This module removes gas bubbles from the medium during transport.  When medium is entering the gas expander module, it rises within a small reservoir and expands before it drops down a barrier. During this process gas bubbles are separated from the medium at the top of the gas expander module. In consequence, medium leaving the container is oxygen-saturated but free of gas bubbles [8,9].

Broad spectrum of applications
In the last years numerous papers were published dealing with the Minusheet perfusion culture system. The wide spectrum illustrates that the modular system was applied to generate specialized tissues in excellent cell biological quality used in tissue engineering, biomaterial research and advanced pharmaceutical drug toxicity testing. A complete list of these applications is found in the data bank ‘Proceedings in perfusion culture’ (see 'External links').
   
As demonstrated by numerous patents (DE 39 23 279, DE 42 00 446, DE 42 08 805, DE 44 43 902, DE 19530 556, DE 196 48 876 C2, DE 199 52 847 B4, US 5 190 878, US 5 316 945, US 5 665 599, J 2847669, DE 10 2005 002 938, PA 10 2004 054 125.6, PA 10 2005 001 747.9, patents pending) Will W. Minuth has invented the presented Minusheet perfusion culture system.

Numerous pilot experiments with the Minusheet perfusion culture system were performed in the last years by Lucia Denk and Will W. Minuth. The experimental work is presently focusing on the creation of an artificial polyester interstitium to repair injured renal parenchyma.

In 1992 the Minusheet perfusion culture system received the Philip Morris research award ‘Challenge of the Future’ in Munich, Germany. The award was handed over by Henry Kissinger, Hans Joachim Friedrichs and Paul Müller.

To introduce the Minusheet perfusion culture system on the market, Katharina Lorenz-Minuth founded non-profit orientated Minucells and Minutissue Vertriebs GmbH (D-93077 Bad Abbach/Germany).

External links
Proceedings in Perfusion Culture
Philip Morris Stiftung
Minusheets Website

References 

1.	Elaut G, Henkens T, Papeleu P, Snykers S, Vinken M, Vanhaecke T, Rogiers V (2006) Molecular mechanisms underlying the dedifferentiation process of isolated hepatocytes and their cultures. Curr Drug Metab 7(6):629-60.
2.	Schuh E, Hofmann S, Stok K, Notbohm H, Müller R, Rotter N (2011) Chondrocyte redifferentiation in 3D: the effect of adhesion site density and substrate elasticity. J Biomed Mater Res A: DOI 10.1002/jbm.a.33226.
3.	Zhang Y, Li TS, Lee ST, Wawrowsky KA, Cheng K, Galang G, Malliaras K, Abraham MR, Wang C, Marban E (2010) Dedifferentiation and proliferation of mammalian cadiomyocytes 2010 PLoS ONE 5(9):e12559.
4.	Liu Y, Jiang X, Yu MK, Dong J, Zhang X, Tsang LL, Chung YW, Li T, Chan HC (2010) Switsching from bone marrow-derived neurons to epithelial cells through dedifferentiation and translineage redifferentiation. Cell Biol Int 34(11):1075-83.
5.	Minuth WW and Denk L 2011 Advanced culture experiments with adherent cells. From single cells to specialized tissues in perfusion culture. ISBN Nr. 978-3-88246-330-9, http://epub.uni-regensburg.de/21484/
6.	Minuth WW, Denk L, Glashauser A 2010 A modular culture system for the generation of multiple specialized tissues. Biomaterials 31:2945-2954.
7.	Strehl R, Schumacher K, Minuth WW 2004 Controlled respiratory gas delivery to embryonic renal explants in perfusion culture. Tissue Eng 10(7-8):1196-203.
8.	Minuth WW, Strehl R, Schumacher K 2004 Tissue factory: conceptual design of a modular system for the in vitro generation of functional tissues. Tissue Eng 10:285-294.
9.	Minuth WW, Denk L, Roessger A 2009 Gradient perfusion culture – Simulating a tissue-specific environment for epithelia in biomedicine. J Epithelial Biology & Pharmacology 2:1-13.

Biomaterials
Biomedicine
Cell culture
Molecular biology techniques